The Ghana Institute of Management and Public Administration (GIMPA)  is a public co-educational university spread over four campuses (Accra, Tema, Kumasi and Takoradi) and made up of six schools, ten research centers located at Greenhill in Accra, Ghana. The location of GIMPA, Greenhill, was named by Nicholas T. Clerk (1930 – 2012) who served as the Rector of the Institute from 1977 to 1982. The name, "Greenhill", is a reference to the lush greenery and hilly topography of the main campus, as well as its location in Legon which was historically on the periphery of the Ghanaian capital, Accra. Together with 200 state institutions, GIMPA successfully participated in a Public Sector Reform Programme under the auspices of the World Bank and became a self-financing institution as part of the National Institutional Reform Programme in 2001. It was established as a public university by an Act of Parliament in 2004. The institute was established in 1961 by the Government of Ghana with assistance from the United Nations Special Fund Project and was initially called the Institute of Public Administration, intended as a specialist training graduate school for civil servants in Ghana. Today, GIMPA offers bachelor's, master's and executive master's degree programmes in business administration, entrepreneurship, law, public administration, development management, governance, leadership and technology.

Schools/faculties
 GIMPA Business School
 School of Public Service and Governance
 School of Liberal Arts and Social Sciences
 Faculty of Law, GIMPA
 School of Technology
 School of Research and Graduate Studies

GIMPA Business School (GBS)

Undergraduate programmes 
 Bachelor of Accounting 
 Bachelor of Finance
 Bachelor of Marketing
 Bachelor, Business Administration
 Bachelor of Human Resource Management
 Bachelor, Procurement, Logistics, and Supply Chain Management
 Bachelor, Hospitality And Tourism Management
Bachelor, Project Management

Postgraduate programmes 
 Certificate in Business Administration (CBA)
 Diploma In Management Studies (DMS)
 Diploma In Business Administration

Graduate programmes 
 Master of Accounting and Finance
 Master of Human Resource Management
 Master of Marketing
 Master of Quality Management
 Master of Supply Chain Management (MSCM)
 Master of Project Management (MPM)
 Master of Natural Resource Accounting
 Executive Masters in Business Administration (EMBA)
 Master Of Business Administration (MBA)
 Master Of Research In Business Administration (MRes)

PhD Programs 
 Doctor of Philosophy in Business Administration (PhD)
 Doctor of Management (DMGT)

GIMPA School of Public Service and Governance,(SPSG)

Undergraduate programs 
 Bachelor of Public Administration

Graduate programs 

Public Sector Management Training Programme (PSMTP)
Masters in Public Health (MPH)
Master of Philosophy in Public Administration (MPA)
Master of Public Administration
Master of Philosophy in Development Finance
Master of Philosophy in Governance & Leadership
Master of Development Management (MDM)
Master Of Arts In International Relations And Diplomacy (MAIRD)
Masters In Regional Integration And African Development (MAIRD)
MSc Environmental Studies And Policy (ESP)
Executive Masters In Governance & Leadership (Emgl) & Executive Masters In Public Administration (EMPA)

PhD Program 
Ph.D. Program In Public Administration, Policy And Governance

Faculty of Law, GIMPA 
The faculty of law at GIMPA was established in 2010 and has quickly grown from its small size of about seventy students and five full-time faculty to over four hundred students and twenty-six full-time faculty in addition to fourteen adjuncts. Faculty of Law, GIMPA brag of the first and only ultra modern moot court facility in Ghana.

 LL.B Day Programme
 LL.B Regular Programme
 LL.B Modular Programme

Law Library & Centres 
 Law Library
 Atta Mills Centre for Law & Governance
 SKB Asante Center for International Negotiations & Mediation

GIMPA School of Technology (SOT)

Undergraduate Programmes 
 BSc Information and Communication Technology (BSc ICT) [Daytime and Evening Sessions]
 BSc Computer Science (BSc CS) [Daytime and Evening Sessions]
 BSc Management Information Systems (BSC MIS) [Daytime and Evening Sessions]
 BSc. Health Informatics [Daytime and Evening Sessions]
 Diploma in Applied Computer Science (Day Session)

Masters Programmes (Evening and Modular Sessions) 
 Master of Philosophy MIS (MPhil MIS) [Evening and Modular Sessions]
 Master of Philosophy ICT (MPhil ICT) [Evening and Modular Sessions]
 Master of Science MIS (MSc MIS) [Evening, Weekend and Modular Sessions]
 Master of Science ICT (MSc ICT) [Evening, Weekend and Modular Sessions]
 Master of Philosophy in Information Systems (MPhil IS) [Evening and Modular Sessions]
 MSc. IT & Law [Evening, Weekend and Modular Sessions]
 MSc. Digital Forensics and Cybersecurity [Evening, Weekend and Modular Sessions]
 MSc. Applied Mathematics [Evening, Weekend and Modular Sessions]

Postgraduate Programmes 
 Post-Graduate Diploma ICT (PD ICT) [Evening and Weekend Sessions]
 Post-Graduate Diploma MIS (PD MIS) [Evening and Weekend Sessions]

Certificate and Short Courses 
 Certificate in ICT (CICT)[Daytime, Evening and Weekend Sessions]
 Mature Entrance Course [Daytime, Evening and Weekend Sessions]

School of Liberal Arts and Social Sciences 
 MSc in Economic Policy
 MSc in Financial Economics
 MSc in Energy Economics
 Mphil in Economics

 Bachelor of Science in Hospitality Management

Short Programs 
 Certificate in Hospitality and Tourism Management
 Certificate in Hotel Management
 Certificate in Housekeeping Management
 Certificate in English Proficiency Course

School of Research and Graduate Studies 
 The Environment and Natural Resource Research Initiative (ENRRI – EfD Ghana)

University leadership

Notable alumni

 Becca – Musician, singer, songwriter and actress

 Kenneth Gilbert Adjei – Former deputy Minister of Defence

 Gifty Afenyi-Dadzie – The first woman to be appointed president of the Ghana Journalist Association (GJA) and the longest-serving official in that position
 Roland Agambire – CEO of Agams Holdings and Chairman and CEO of the ICT company Rlg Communications
 Charles Agyin-Asare – Founder of Perez Chapel International and Precious TV
 Samuel Kwame Adibu Asiedu – Justice of the Supreme Court of Ghana 
Akua Sena Dansua– Former Member of Parliament for North Dayi, former Minister of Women and Children Affairs, Youth and Sports and Tourism.
Eldah Naa Abiana Dickson (Abiana) – Musician and songwriter
 Patrick Amoah-Ntim – Ghanaian diplomat
 Mimi Areme – Miss World 2010 (1st Runner Up Beauty with A Purpose, Miss Ghana 2009)(Winner)
Theresa Lardi Awuni –Member of Ghana Parliament for Okaikwei North Constituency
 Samira Bawumia  – Second Lady of Ghana
 Aliu Mahama – 4th Vice President of the Republic of Ghana(3rd Vice President of the 4th Republic)
 Lordina Mahama  – the former First Lady of Ghana (2012 - 2017)
 Daniel McKorley – McDan Group of Companies
 Kojo Oppong Nkrumah – Minister of Information and MP for Ofoasi/Ayirebi
 Imoro Yakubu Kakpagu  – Member of Ghana Parliament for Kumbungu (Jan 2009 -Jan 2013)
Kwame Anyimadu-Antwi - Member of Ghana Parliament for Asante Akim-Central
John Dumelo – Ghanaian Actor, Politician, and Farmer.
Yvonne Nelson – Ghanaian Actress, Model, Film producer, and Entrepreneur.
Rita Korankye Ankrah  – Premier Lady of Royalhouse Chapel International

Research and advocacy
 Centre for Health Systems and Policy Research (CHESPOR)
 Centre for Learning on Evaluation and Results (CLEAR)
 Centre for Management Development (CMD)
 Centre for IT Development (CITD)
 African Centre of International Criminal Justice (ACICJ)
 Gender and Development Resource Centre (GDRC)
 Centre for West African Studies (CWAS)
 African Centre on Law and Ethics
 Management Development Institute
 Academy of Leadership and Executive Training (ALET)

References

External links
 Official Website
GIMPA Admission Form

Ghana Institute of Management and Public Administration
Education in Accra
1961 establishments in Ghana
Educational institutions established in 1961